Jamhore is a village and a notified area in Aurangabad district in the Indian state of Bihar.

 India census, Jamhore had a population of 8575. Males constitute 52% of the population and females 48%. Jamhore has an average literacy rate of 50%, lower than the national average of 59.5%: male literacy is 60%, and female literacy is 38%. In Jamhor, 18% of the population is under 6 years of age.

jamhor famous because of  katuun she is the jamindar of that area after Mughal it's taken over through Rajputana and they did several things for that village like railway station, school, hospital, cumunit hall, also crime, castizem is on upper level Rajputana still dominating that place some of Rajputana name like Shamsher Bahadur Singh is one of powerful person in 70-80s, Gupteshwar Prasad Singh He is Mines owner and he did several things for  poor people also to villagers.on drought time of eastern part of India 1962,64 Made several Relief Cams for all citizens in many city of Bihar.

References

Cities and towns in Aurangabad district, Bihar